Pollet is a surname. People named Pollet include:

 Abel Pollet (1873–1909), French gangster and murderer
 David Pollet (born 1988), Belgian footballer
 Eugène Pollet (1886-?), French gymnast
 Francis Pollet (born 1964) French general officer
 Gerry Pollet, American lawyer and politician
 Howie Pollet (1921-1974), American baseball player
 Jacques Pollet (1922-1997), French automobile racer
 Jean-Daniel Pollet (1936-2004), French film director and screenwriter
 Joseph Pollet (1897–1979), American painter
 Lisette Pollet (born 1968), French politician
 Ludovic Pollet (born 1970), French former footballer and current coach
 Marianne Ehrenström (1773-1867), née Pollet, Swedish artist